Jacob ben Ḥayyim Alfandari (1620 – 1695) was a talmudic writer and rabbi in Istanbul in the 17th century. In 1686, he refers to himself as an old man. He was the author of a volume of responsa edited by his nephew Ḥayyim the Younger (Istanbul, 1718), entitled Muẓẓal me-Esh (Plucked from the Fire), because it was saved from a conflagration which consumed most of the author's manuscripts. Others of his responsa are printed in the collection of his father and in that of Joseph Kazabi.

See also
 Alfandari

References 

 

17th-century rabbis from the Ottoman Empire
17th-century writers from the Ottoman Empire
Rabbis from Istanbul
1620 births
1695 deaths